is a Japanese automobile tuner and parts manufacturer. The company was founded by Japanese automotive engineer and driver, Kazuhiko “Smokey” Nagata.

The company is mainly known for its tuning, aftermarket parts, body kits, and performance engineering. Top Secret's current product lineup consists of aero, exterior and interior, engine, exhaust , chassis, brake, suspension, and powertrain parts.

Top Secret is also known for its illegal Wangan high speed runs, professional drifting, circuit, and drag racing.

History 
Founder Kazuhiko “Smoky'' Nagata began his career as a mechanic for Toyota as their youngest employee. He then became a tuner and fabricator at Trust/GReddy. As he began using the Trust shop for his own personal projects in 1978, the name "Top Secret" was born, as a nickname for his discreet work at the Trust facility. His employers allowed this to continue as Nagata was a highly skilled employee and valuable asset to the company.

Top Secret became independent from Trust in 1991 and set up their own shop in Chiba. In 1993, the company began exhibiting at the Tokyo Auto Salon.

Since 1994, Nagata and the Top Secret team have participated in speed trials and speed challenges such as 0-400 km/h (0-249 mph), 0-300km/h (0-186 mph), 1000m, and top speed challenges. Nagata famously performed many illegal speed runs on public roads, including 341km/h (212 mph) on the Autobahn (Germany), 358km/h (222 mph) on Nardò (Italy) with a Top Secret V12 Supra, and 317km/h (197 mph) on public roads in the UK. He is well known in the JDM car community and became universally known because of reposted clips on different social media platforms of these illegal high speed runs. Some clips found on YouTube are sourced from “Midnight 200mph Blast”(DVD). 

A recognizable feature of many Top Secret tuned cars are their gold paint schemes. Only cars that Nagata deem to be his best work receive this special gold paint scheme.

Top Secret won the 2007 Tokyo Auto Salon Championship with its "Final Evolution" V12 twin turbo Toyota Supra. At the 2017 Tokyo Auto Salon, Top Secret debuted an R32 Nissan Skyline GT-R that had been transplanted with the engine, driveline, and interior of the newer R35 Nissan GT-R. The tuning company dubbed this car the "Skyline VR32 GT-R".

Motorsport 
Ryuji Miki won Round 5, and ultimately won the 2004 Japanese D1GP championship in a Nissan Silvia S15 racing for Top Secret. In 2005 Miki won an exhibition round at Silverstone Circuit in the UK in a Nissan Fairlady Z.

In 2007, Yoichi Imamura took 3rd place at Round 3 and 6 at Suzuka and Autopolis respectively. Imamura also won an exhibition round at Las Vegas Motor Speedway the same year.

Racing Results

D1GP

References 

Automotive motorsports and performance companies
Japanese brands